Quesnelia blanda is a species of flowering plant in the family Bromeliaceae, endemic to southeastern Brazil. It was first described in 1856 as Bromelia blanda. , the Encyclopaedia of Bromeliads listed it under the synonym Quesnelia strobilospica, which it spelt Quesnelia strobilispica.

References

blanda
Flora of Brazil
Plants described in 1856